Second Lieutenant Orville Tyron Chamberlain (September 1, 1841 to May 27, 1929) was an American soldier who fought in the American Civil War. Chamberlain received the United States' highest award for bravery during combat, the Medal of Honor, for his action during the Battle of Chickamauga, Georgia on 20 September 1863. He was honored with the award on 11 March 1896.

Biography
Chamberlain was born in Leesburgh, Indiana on September 1, 1841. He enlisted in the 74th Indiana Infantry.  He graduated from Notre Dame University in 1868 and became a lawyer.  Married Helen Maria Mead (1843-1911) and they had one child, Edith Chamberlain (1872-1933).  In 1914 served in Washington as acting chairman of Legislation Army and Navy Medal of Honor Legion of U.S.A. and was a proponent of $10 per month pension addition for medal of honor recipients.

He died on May 27, 1929 and his remains are interred at the Grace Lawn Cemetery in Elkhart, Indiana.

Medal of Honor citation

See also

 List of American Civil War Medal of Honor recipients: A–F

References

1841 births
1929 deaths
People of Indiana in the American Civil War
Union Army officers
United States Army Medal of Honor recipients
American Civil War recipients of the Medal of Honor